(born 2 August 1985 in Miyagi Prefecture, Japan) is a Japanese rugby union player who plays for the New England Free Jacks of Major League Rugby (MLR). 

Hatakeyama has played 78 matches for the Japan national rugby union team.

Professional rugby career
Hatakeyama was a member of the Japan team at the 2011 Rugby World Cup; he played four matches and scored one try.

He was also a member of the Japan team that competed in the 2015 Rugby World Cup, including the historic victory over the South Africa Springboks in Brighton. 

In July 2017, Hatakeyama was appointed a Representative Director of the Japanese Rugby Football Association. 

In 2020, Hatakeyama joined the New England Free Jacks in Major League Rugby, debuting for the Free Jacks in the team's MLR debut.

References

1985 births
Living people
Expatriate rugby union players in England
Expatriate rugby union players in the United States
Japan international rugby union players
Japanese  expatriate rugby union players
Japanese expatriate sportspeople in England
Japanese expatriate sportspeople in the United States
New England Free Jacks players
Newcastle Falcons players
People from Kesennuma, Miyagi
Rugby union props
Sportspeople from Miyagi Prefecture
Tokyo Sungoliath players
Waseda University Rugby Football Club players
Japanese rugby union players
Toyota Industries Shuttles Aichi players